Uisenma Borchu (born Borkhüügiin Uizenmaa; 1 June 1984) is a Mongolian-German film maker and film actress. In 1989, she moved with her family from Communist Mongolia to East Germany—which was on the brink of reunification, where she grew up. During the period of 2006 to 2015 she studied documentary film at the University of Television and Film in Munich.

Filmography

Feature films

Acting roles

Awards and nominations

References

External links

 
 

1984 births
Living people
Mongolian artists
University of Television and Film Munich alumni
Mongolian film directors
Mongolian women film directors
Mongolian documentary filmmakers
21st-century Mongolian artists
Women documentary filmmakers
Mongolian screenwriters